Harouna Abou Demba Sy (born 31 December 1991) is a professional footballer who plays as a right back for  club Martigues. Born in France, he represents Mauritania at international level.

Club career
Born in Mont-Saint-Aignan, France, Sy has played for Sedan B, Reims B, Boulogne B, Boulogne, Amiens B and GS Consolat.

On 13 June 2022, Abou Demba signed with Martigues in Championnat National.

International career
He made his international debut for Mauritania in 2016.

He played for the national team at the African Cup of Nations 2019, the first international tournament of the team

References

1991 births
Living people
People from Mont-Saint-Aignan
Sportspeople from Seine-Maritime
Association football fullbacks
Citizens of Mauritania through descent
Mauritanian footballers
Mauritania international footballers
French footballers
French sportspeople of Mauritanian descent
CS Sedan Ardennes players
Stade de Reims players
US Boulogne players
Amiens SC players
Athlético Marseille players
Grenoble Foot 38 players
FC Martigues players
Championnat National 2 players
Championnat National players
Ligue 2 players
2019 Africa Cup of Nations players
2021 Africa Cup of Nations players
Footballers from Normandy